In the Belly of the Green Bird is a 2006 book by Nir Rosen which describes the events in Iraq after the U.S. invasion and the fall of Saddam Hussein. The book builds on nearly three years spent in Iraq observing ordinary life and talking with a wide range of people involved in and affected by the violence. Rosen's thesis is that Iraq is now in a state of civil war and that the U.S. can do little to stop the increasing violence. Rosen was able to take advantage of his fluent Arabic to mix unobtrusively with Iraqis and to dispense with translators in his interviews (Massing).

The book should not be confused with In the Hearts of Green Birds, an Islamist text about the war in Bosnia. Both books take their titles from the common belief that the souls of martyrs live in Paradise in the hearts of green birds.

References
Elliott, Debbie. "Rosen's Reporting Targets 'Belly' of Iraq," All Things Considered, June 10, 2006, National Public Radio 
Massing, Michael. "Iraq, the Press and the Election," New York Review of Books, Volume 51, Number 20 · December 16, 2004
Rosen, Nir. In the Belly of the Green Bird: The Triumph of the Martyrs in Iraq, New York: Free Press, 2006. 
Xenakis, Nicholas J. "T for Terrorist," [Review of V for Vendetta and In the Belly of the Green Bird] The National Interest, Vol. 84 (Summer 2006). pp. 134–138.

Iraqi insurgency (2003–2011)
2006 non-fiction books